Chhittaraja was Shilahara  ruler of north Konkan branch from 1022 CE – 1035 CE.

Chhittaraja succeeded his uncle Arikesarin some time before 1026 CE, when he issued his Bhandup plates. Chhittaraja was a patron of art and literature. He built the magnificent temple of Shiva at Ambarnath near Kalyan. He patronised Soddhala, the author of the Udayasundarikatha. (Dept. Gazetteer: 2002)

See also
 Shilahara

References
 Bhandarkar R.G. (1957): Early History of Deccan, Sushil Gupta (I) Pvt Ltd, Calcutta.
 Fleet J.F (1896) :The Dynasties of the Kanarese District of The Bombay Presidency, Written for the Bombay Gazetteer .
 Department of Gazetteer, Govt of Maharashtra (2002) : Itihaas : Prachin Kal, Khand -1 (Marathi)
 Department of Gazetteer, Govt of Maharashtra (1960) : Kolhapur District Gazetteer
 Department of Gazetteer, Govt of Maharashtra (1964) : Kolaba District Gazetteer
 Department of Gazetteer, Govt of Maharashtra (1982) : Thane District Gazetteer
 A.S.Altekar (1936) : The Silaharas of Western India

External links
 Silver Coin of Shilaharas of Southern Maharashtra (Coinex 2006 - Souvenir)

Shilahara dynasty
11th-century rulers in Asia
1035 deaths
Year of birth unknown